Giampietro Zanotti (1674–1765) was an Italian painter and art historian of the late-Baroque or Rococo period.

He studied painting in Bologna with Lorenzo Pasinelli. In the first decade of the 18th century, he became one of the founding members of the artists' academy in Bologna , known as the Accademia Clementina. Among his writings was a guide to young painters: Avvertimenti per l'incamminamento di un giovane alla pittura. He also wrote a biography about the painter and friend Giovanni Gioseffo Dal Sole. Giampietro's brother, Francesco Maria Zanotti, was a philosopher in Bologna. His son Eustachio Zanotti was a noted astronomer and mathematician (1709–1782). Among his pupils was Ercole Lelli, best known for his anatomic studies in wax.

Partial Anthology

References
 Getty museum biography.

External links

1674 births
1765 deaths
Italian art historians
18th-century Italian painters
Italian male painters
Painters from Bologna
Rococo painters
Italian Baroque painters
18th-century Italian male artists